Athanasia pectinata is a species of plant from the Western Cape of South Africa.

Description 
It has few branches. Each of the pinnatisect (split into sections nearly to the midrib, not quite forming leaflets) leaves has 3-5 lobes. Solitary disc shaped flower heads are crowded in terminal compound inflorescences at the ends of branches. They are yellow in colour and are present between October and December.

Distribution and habitat 
This plant is endemic to South Africa. It grows in the Western Cape, where it is found on damp clay soils between Hermanus and Gouritsmond.

Conservation 
This species is common and is considered to be of least concern by the South African National Biodiversity Institute.

References 

Anthemideae
Plants described in 1782
Fauna of South Africa